Kuwait competed at the 2004 Summer Paralympics in Athens, Greece. The team included 14 athletes, 13 men and 1 women. Competitors from Kuwait won 6 medals, including 1 gold, 2 silver and 3 bronze to finish 48th in the medal table.

Medallists

Sports

Athletics

Men's track

Men's field

Women's field

Powerlifting

Men

Wheelchair fencing

Men

Teams

See also
Kuwait at the Paralympics
Kuwait at the 2004 Summer Olympics

References 

Nations at the 2004 Summer Paralympics
2004
Summer Paralympics